Ali Asgar may refer to:
 Ali Asgar, Chaharmahal and Bakhtiari
 Ali Asgar, Lorestan